Diamine acetyltransferase 1 is an enzyme that in humans is encoded by the SAT1 gene found on the X chromosome.

Function 

Spermidine/spermine N(1)-acetyltransferase (SPD/SPM acetyltransferase) is a rate-limiting enzyme in the catabolic pathway of polyamine metabolism. It catalyzes the N(1)-acetylation of spermidine and spermine and, by the successive activity of polyamine oxidase, spermine can be converted to spermidine and spermidine to putrescine. The SAT1 gene is used to help regulate polyamine levels inside the cell by regulating their transport in and out of the cell. SAT1 is also involved in the first step to synthesize N-acetylputrescine from putrescine.  PMF1 and NRF2 work together to transcript the SAT1 gene.

Structure 
The SAT1 gene is 3,069 base pairs long.  There are 171 amino acids and its molecular mass is 20024 Da Daltons).  In 1992 at The Johns Hopkins University School of Medicine, Lei Xiao and several others cloned over 4000 base pairs of the region containing the coding sequence of the SAT1 gene also referred to as SSAT-1, SSAT, SAT, KFSD, DC21, KFSDX gene.  This gene is located on the X chromosome in the region Xp22.1.  The primer extension analysis indicated that the transcription started 179 bases upstream from the translational start site.  Furthermore, they determined that it appeared to be controlled by a "TATA-less" promoter.  Normally, there would be a TATA box where RNA polymerase II would be involved in assisting with initiation by properly positioning the enzyme, however in a TATA-less promoter situation the TATA box is absent.

Clinical significance
An association with keratosis follicularis spinulosa decalvans (KFSD) has been suggested. Data shows that keratosis follicularis spinulosa decalvans could be caused by mutations in the SAT 1 gene. KSFD is also believed to be X-linked, which helps prove that the disease is caused by a mutation found in the SAT 1 gene which is located on the X chromosome. The mutation most likely occurs at the location Xp22.1. KDSF mostly affects men, which makes sense for it to be an X-linked disease, caused by a mutation of the SAT1 gene.

Elevated levels of RNA transcripts of SAT1 in the bloodstream have been associated with a higher risk of suicide.

The SAT1 gene has implications with NLS-2 Neu–Laxova syndrome, type 2 (NLS). It is inherited as an autosomal recessive trait and is considered a rare lethal congenital disorder. Severe growth delays before birth including low birth weight and shorter than normal length occur. After birth, outward observable characteristics include significant small skull size (microcephaly), wider than normal spaced eyes, sloped forehead and other disfiguring facial features. There may also be random places of fluid retention (edema) throughout the body and permanent joint limitations due to limb malformations. NLS can be detected in pregnant woman with ultrasound examination. In some people of Neu-Laxova syndrome, other areas were severely affected such as skin, genitals, and other internal organs including the heart. Males and females are equally affected and could be most closely associated with persons of Pakistani origin. However, there have been cases reported in several other diverse backgrounds. The prognosis is extremely poor and in most cases the infant dies shortly after birth or are stillborn. The first documented and reported case in Japan involved a baby girl exhibiting microcephaly, severe edema, and other symptoms. In her case she had a condition known as congenital vertical talus or rocker-feet. The foot is abnormally shaped in a convex position. She survived 134 days.

The SAT1 gene plays a vital role in the catabolic pathway of polyamine metabolism. It acts as a rate-limiting enzyme in the pathway of polyamine metabolism, meaning it is significant in the involvement of cell survival. Research has shown that the tumor protein known as p53 can specifically target the SAT1 gene that results in ferroptotic cell-death. Ferroptosis is when a death of a cell is caused by an iron-dependent accumulation of a lipid.

References

Further reading